Orthotylus salicorniae is a species of bug from the Miridae family that is endemic to Canary Islands.

References

Insects described in 1953
salicorniae